Cnesmone is a genus of plant of the family Euphorbiaceae first described as a genus in 1826. It is native to southern China and to much of Southeast Asia (Indochina, Philippines, Indonesia, etc.).

Species

formerly included
moved to Megistostigma 
Cnesmone glabrata - Megistostigma glabratum

References

Plukenetieae
Euphorbiaceae genera